The Chesapeake Bay Commission is an advisory body that consults with the legislatures of Maryland, Virginia and Pennsylvania about environmental, economic and social issues related to the Chesapeake Bay. The commission is a signatory to all agreements on matters regarding the bay, and advises Congress on bay-related issues. The commission was established under state law in 1980 by the states of Maryland and Virginia. Pennsylvania joined the commission in 1985.

The commission was a signatory to the Chesapeake Bay Agreement of 1983, which was also signed by the governors of Maryland, Virginia and Pennsylvania; the Mayor of the District of Columbia; and the Administrator of the United States Environmental Protection Agency (EPA). The agreement recognized the need for a cooperative approach among the various governmental jurisdictions to address pollution problems in the bay, and established the Chesapeake Bay Program, an inter-agency partnership of federal and state agencies, academic institutions, citizen groups and non-governmental organizations.

The commission membership consists of state legislators, state cabinet secretaries and citizen representatives. As of 2023, the chair of the commission is Scott Martin, State Senator of Pennsylvania. The full commission meets quarterly, and staff maintain offices in Annapolis, Maryland; Richmond, Virginia; and Harrisburg, Pennsylvania.

See also
 Chesapeake Bay Program – regional inter-agency partnership
 Chesapeake Research Consortium

References

External links
 

Commission
Councils of governments
Government agencies established in 1980
Maryland General Assembly
Pennsylvania General Assembly
Virginia General Assembly